Vici may refer to:

 The plural of the Latin vicus
 "I conquered" in Latin, first person perfect of vincere, notably part of the phrase Veni, vidi, vici
 V.I.C.I., short for Voice Input Child Identicant, nicknamed Vicki, the android title character in Small Wonder
 Vici Gaming, Chinese eSports organization with teams in Dota 2, League of Legends, and Hearthstone
 Vici Properties, American real estate investment trust
 Vici, Oklahoma

See also
 Vicci
 Vichy (disambiguation)
 Viki (disambiguation)